Tetrapyrgia ('four towers') was a town in the district of Garsauria of ancient Cappadocia.

Its site is tentatively located near Kemeryayla, in Asiatic Turkey.

References

Populated places in ancient Cappadocia
Former populated places in Turkey
History of Mersin Province